Mickey Free (b. 1847/1848; d. 1914, Apache name Mig-gan-la-iae), birth name Felix Telles, was an Apache Indian scout and bounty hunter on the American frontier. Following his kidnapping by Apaches as a child, he was raised as one and became a warrior. Later he joined the US Army's Apache scouts, serving at Fort Verde between December 1874 and May 1878 and was given the nickname Mickey Free.

Early life
Telles' mother was Maria Jesus Martinez, a Mexican woman. His father was  Santiago Telles. As sixteen-year-olds, the two met and fell in love but Telles did not marry Maria Jesus, perhaps because of resistance from Santiago's parents. His given name at birth was Felix. In 1858, Maria Jesus and her two children, Felix and his half-sister, Teodora Rangel, met and moved in with John Ward, an Irishman who had migrated to the Arizona Territory and started a ranch. The August 26, 1860 United States Census for the Sonoita Creek settlement in the Arizona Territory indicates that Felix Ward was 12 years old, his sister Teodora was 10, and his sister Mary Ward was 5 months. Maria Jesus Martinez was listed as 30 years old and John Ward as 54 years old. A half-brother, Santiago Ward, later claimed his birth as July 25, 1860, but this contradicts the census record. John Ward and María Jesús had five children before his death in 1867.

Capture by the Apaches
Felix was abducted at age 12 on January 27, 1861, by a Pinal Apache raiding party. He was later traded to the Coyotero Apache, who are also known as White Mountain Apaches. The kidnapping had lasting implications for relations between the Apache and the United States. John Ward was away from his home on Sonoita Creek on business. Returning home, he learned from neighbors that his cattle and step-son had been taken by Apaches.

He went immediately to Lieutenant Colonel Pitcairn Morrison at Fort Buchanan and believing that his stepson had been taken by Chiricahua Apaches, insisted on military intervention. Second Lieutenant George Nicholas Bascom, acting on orders set out on January 28 to find the trail. In the morning he could not locate it. In the afternoon, he located a trail leading east toward Chiricahua country and Apache Pass.

Bascom, commander of Company C, 7th Infantry, knew from experience that only Chiricahua would go east. What he did not realize was that the opening of Fort Breckinridge on Aravaipa Creek and the San Pedro River in the Pinal homeland was forcing all raiders to go east.  The events which followed became known as the Bascom Affair and triggered the Chiricahua Wars.

On 4 February 1861, on orders to retrieve the child at all costs, Bascom went to  Apache Pass to seek out Cochise, son-in-law of Mangas Coloradas. Cochise said he didn't have the child but thought he knew who did and if given ten days could bring him in.  Bascom had the Apaches surrounded, informing Cochise they would be held as hostages until the child was returned. Cochise escaped and captured his own hostages to offer in exchange, but Bascom refused. A series of violent retaliatory actions followed from each side before the Chiricahua Apaches eventually declared war.

Telles was adopted and raised by Nayundiie, a White Mountain Apache, and became foster brother to Tlol-dil-zil, later known as John Rope.

Scout for the US Army
He joined the U.S. Army's Apache Scouts on 2 December 1872 as a scout and within two years he was promoted to the rank of sergeant. He was posted to Camp Verde to serve as an interpreter, where he met Al Sieber.

Because the soldiers could not pronounce the Scouts' names, they gave them nicknames. Due to his red hair and other features, the soldiers claimed the scout named Feliz, bore a resemblance to a character in Charles Lever's 1840 novel, Charles O'Malley: The Irish Dragoon named "Mickey Free".

Free served as a scout for George Crook in the pursuit of Geronimo and Nana. He accompanied Crook on his expedition to the Sierra Madres in 1883 and accompanied Chatto and other Apaches on a visit to Washington, D.C. in 1886. He left the scouts in 1893.

In his time as a bounty hunter, Free tracked the Apache Kid, who at one point had a $15,000 reward on his head.

Later life and death
After leaving the Army, Free moved to the Fort Apache Indian Reservation with the remainder of the White Mountain Apache Scouts and lived out the rest of his life as a farmer until his death in 1914. He married four times and had two sons and two daughters.

References

Bibliography

Further reading
 Lords of Apacheria: Mickey Free, the Hunt for Geronimo and the Apache Kid, and the Longest War in American History Crown Publishing Group (NY) 2014 

Year of birth uncertain
1914 deaths
United States Army Indian Scouts
American frontier
Apache Wars
Bounty hunters